Salu may refer to:

People
 The father of Zimri, the Israelite who was killed by Phinehas in Numbers 25 for having sexual relations with a Midianite woman
Tina Salu, New Zealand female football player
Togbui Salu III, Dutor (Chief) of Anlo Afiadenyigba in Ghana

Places
Ṣalu Monastery, in Shigatse, Tibet
Salu, Harju County, village in Rae Parish, Harju County, Estonia
Salu, Pärnu County, village in Halinga Parish, Pärnu County, Estonia
Salu, Saare County, village in Orissaare Parish, Saare County, Estonia
Salu, Tartu County, village in Tartu Parish, Tartu County, Estonia
Salu, Iran (disambiguation)
Salu (Samoa), village in Samoa

Others
Salu (cloth), a type of cotton cloth in Indian subcontinent